Jithan 2 is a 2016 Indian Tamil language horror comedy film directed by Rahul Paramahamsa and written by Vincent Selva. The film is a sequel to Jithan (2005), and stars Jithan Ramesh and Srushti Dange. The film began production in December 2013 and it released on 8 April 2016 to poor reviews. The film was dubbed and released in Telugu as Pizza 3 in 2018. The film had background score by Yeshwanth Raja. The film received negative reviews from critics.

Cast

Jithan Ramesh as Surya
Srushti Dange as Priya
Meghali as Anjali
Mayilsamy as Venugopal
Yogi Babu as Annayya
George Maryan as Sombu Vinayagam
Robo Shankar as Police Officer
Vinoth Babu as Police Constable
Karunas as Surya's known person
Sona Heiden
Swaminathan
Nellai Siva as Vijayakumar
Bharanidharan as Bharani
Supergood Subramani
Kesava
Vengal Rao
Sandy(cameo appearance)

Production
In September 2013, RPM productions began working on a sequel to the successful 2005 film Jithan, with newcomer Rahul brought in as director. The script was written by Vincent Selva who has directed the first one. The team tried to bring in actor to play a parallel lead role, but were unsuccessful in their attempts. The film subsequently progressed throughout Chennai. Srushti Dange has been confirmed as the heroine for Jithan 2.
The film was on the verge of completion in July 2014, with all portions apart from the songs finished. The team began post-production work in late 2014 and targeted an April 8, 2016 release.

Reception
The film received negative reviews from critics. Sify wrote "Generally, even a poorly made movie have some kind of positive aspects to talk about but Jithan 2 is a nightmare, which we want to quickly erase from our memory". Times of India wrote "Jithan-2 involves a ghost and is billed as a horror movie, but the only thing that haunts us after seeing the film — and might even result in sleepless nights — is an unending stream of questions." Rediff wrote "Painfully slow, drab and immature, this horror comedy has you yawning right from the start." The Hindu wrote that "Jithan 2 is so bad in every department, so soporific an experience, so dreadfully tedious that I fear that my experience of watching it has, on some level, robbed me just a little of my will to live". The film underperformed at the box office. Mukesh Kumar and Rakesh Reddy of Desimartini both gave 0.5 stars out of 5 and said "The movie is as wasteful as 'ueue' in the 'queue'. makes absolutely no sense whatsoever." and "Overall a time waste of a movie" respectively.

References

External links
 

Indian comedy horror films
Indian sequel films
2010s Tamil-language films
Films scored by Srikanth Deva
2016 comedy horror films